Demetrios Stephen Petrokokkinos (17 April 1878 in Ilford (registered at birth in England as Demetrius Stephen Petrocochino) – 10 May 1942 in Cape Town) was a Greek tennis player.  He competed at the 1896 Summer Olympics in Athens.

Petrokokkinos was defeated in the first round of the singles tournament by fellow Greek Evangelos Rallis.  This put him in a six-way tie for eighth (last) place among the thirteen man field. In the doubles tournament, Petrokokkinos again faced Rallis in the first round.  This time, Petrokokkinos and his partner Dionysios Kasdaglis a Greek from Egypt, a team nowadays considered a Greek team, defeated Rallis and his partner Konstantinos Paspatis.  Petrokokkinos and Kasdaglis faced Edwin Flack of Australia and George S. Robertson of Great Britain and Ireland in the semifinals, again winning the match to advance to the final.  There, they met Irishman John Pius Boland and German Friedrich Traun, to whom they lost to place second.

References

External links

1878 births
1942 deaths
People from Ilford
Tennis people from Greater London
19th-century Greek people
19th-century male tennis players
Greek male tennis players
Olympic silver medalists for Greece
Olympic tennis players of Greece
Tennis players at the 1896 Summer Olympics
Olympic medalists in tennis
Medalists at the 1896 Summer Olympics
Greek emigrants to South Africa
Greek expatriates in the United Kingdom